Rainy Taxi (1938), also known as Mannequin Rotting in a Taxi-Cab, is a three-dimensional artwork created by Salvador Dalí, consisting of an actual automobile with two mannequin occupants.   

A male chauffeur with a shark head is in the front seat, and a female sits in the back seat. A system of pipes causes "rainfall" within the taxi. The female wears an evening dress, her hair is tousled, and lettuce and chicory grow around her. Live snails crawl across her body. 

The piece was first displayed in 1938 at the Galerie Beaux-Arts in Paris of the Exposition Internationale du Surréalisme, organised by André Breton and Paul Éluard. The main hall of the Exposition was designed by Marcel Duchamp and Wolfgang Paalen, who was responsible for the supervision of the water installations. 

A reconstruction of the original installation is installed in the open courtyard of the Dalí Theatre and Museum in Figueres, Catalonia, Spain.

See also
Surrealism
Mae West Lips Sofa
Lobster Telephone

References

External links
Salvador Dali’s The Rainy Taxi (image)

Surrealist works
1938 sculptures
Works by Salvador Dalí
Sculptures in France
Collection of the Dalí Theatre and Museum